Come Away, Death is a 1937 mystery detective novel by the British writer Gladys Mitchell. It is the eight in her long-running series featuring the psychoanalyst and amateur detective Mrs Bradley. Although the plot revolves around Greek Mythology, the title is taken from a line from Shakespeare's Twelfth Night. It was followed by a loose sequel Lament for Leto in 1971.

Synopsis
Keen to rediscover the secret of the Eleusinian Mysteries, archaeologist Sir Rudri Hopkinson plans to recreate the traditional rituals in Greece and summon the ancient gods. However from the beginning a series of strange incidents mar the expedition, ultimately ending in murder.

References

Bibliography
 Evans, Curtis. Masters of the "Humdrum" Mystery: Cecil John Charles Street, Freeman Wills Crofts, Alfred Walter Stewart and the British Detective Novel, 1920-1961. McFarland, 2014.
 Klein, Kathleen Gregory. Great Women Mystery Writers: Classic to Contemporary. Greenwood Press, 1994.
 Miskimmin, Esme. 100 British Crime Writers. Springer Nature, 2020.
 Reilly, John M. Twentieth Century Crime & Mystery Writers. Springer, 2015.

1937 British novels
Novels by Gladys Mitchell
British crime novels
British mystery novels
British thriller novels
Novels set in Greece
British detective novels
Michael Joseph books